Dolce & Gabbana, also known by initials D&G, is an Italian luxury fashion house founded in 1985 in Legnano by Italian designers Domenico Dolce and Stefano Gabbana. The house specializes in ready-to-wear, handbags, accessories, and cosmetics and licenses its name and branding to Luxottica for eyewear.

History

Early history 
Domenico Dolce and Stefano Gabbana met each other in 1982 in a Milan club. They had previously designed for the fashion brand of Giorgio Correggiari. In 1983, they established a design consulting studio "Dolce & Gabbana". They presented their first women's collection in 1985 in Milan, where a year later their store would open its doors. The SS 1986 collection was titled Geometrissimo and was debuted alongside five other up-and-coming Italian labels as part of Milan Fashion Week. Dolce and Gabbana did not have enough money to hire models or provide them with accessories, so they sought help from their friends. Their friends served as models and wore their personal items to accessorize the clothing. A bed sheet from Dolce's home was used as their stage curtain. 

In March 1986, Dolce & Gabanna released their first self-produced collection Woman FW 1986/1987 entitled Donne Vere/Real Women. The name of the collection was due in part to the participation of local women as models on the runway. Sales from their first collection were disappointing enough for Gabbana to cancel the fabric order they'd put in to create their second collection. However, Dolce's family offered to help meet their costs when the two visited them in Sicily over Christmas, while incidentally, the fabric company did not receive the cancellation notice in time so the fabric was ready for them back in Milan upon their return.  

In 1987, Dolce & Gabbana presented the Women's SS 1988 fashion show entitled Il Gattopardo/The Leopard line, and in 1989 they began designing underwear and swimming costumes. Dolce & Gabbana started to export their products to Japan and other countries including the United States, where they founded their own showroom in 1990. In 1990, the same year they presented their men's collection for 1991/1992, they also launched their first perfume Dolce & Gabbana. D&G won the Woolmark award in 1991, and Perfume's Academy "Most Feminine Flavor of the Year" in 1993 for their fragrance Dolce & Gabbana Parfum. By the end of the 1990s, the company's revenues were around US$500 million and in 2003 their revenue reached $633 million. By 2005, their turnover was €600 million. 

In 1990  the brand opened its first women's boutique in Via Sant’Andrea, Milan. Michael Gross wrote of their third collection in a 1992 interview, "They were a secret known only to a handful of Italian fashion editors. Their few models changed behind a rickety screen. They called their collection of T-shirt-cotton and elastic-silk pieces, Transformation." The clothing in this collection came with instructions on the seven different ways a piece could be worn in an outfit, as the wearer could use Velcro and snaps to alter the clothing's form. 

Their fourth collection was the first to make a significant impact on the Italian fashion market. In this collection, Dolce drew upon his Sicilian roots. The collection's advertising campaign was shot by photographer Ferdinando Scianna in Sicily, and featured Dutch model Marpessa Hennink in black and white pictures inspired by the Italian cinema of the 1940s. They continued the use of Italian cinema as inspiration in their fifth collection, drawing on the work of filmmaker Luchino Visconti and his film The Leopard. 

One of the pieces from their fourth collection was labeled "The Sicilian Dress" by the fashion press, and was named by author Hal Rubenstein as one of the 100 most important dresses ever designed. It is considered to be the most representative piece of this era for the brand. Rubenstein described the piece in 2012 by writing, "The Sicilian dress is the essence of Dolce & Gabbana, the brand's sartorial touchstone. The dress takes its cue from a slip—but it's a slip that's adorned Anna Magnani, and it's a silhouette that has graced Anita Ekberg, Sophia Loren, [and so forth]. The straps fit tight to the body just as bra straps would; the neckline runs straight across but gets waylaid at least twice, once on each side to caress each breast and in the middle to meet an uplifting tuck that's giving a gentle push up. The slip doesn't just slide down, but comes in at the waist to hold the figure firmly but not too tightly and then widens to emphasise the hips, only to fall with a slight taper at the knees to guarantee that the hips will sway when the wearer walks."

1980s and 1990s  

In 1987, the two launched a separate knitwear collection line and in 1989, they started designing a lingerie line and a beachwear line. Two years later, they launched their leopard line. In 1989, Dolce & Gabbana opened their first store in Japan in partnership with Kashiyama Co. They started to export their products to the United States, where they founded their own showroom in 1990. In 1992, the same year that they presented their men's collection, they also launched  the first "Dolce & Gabbana Pour Femme", produced and distributed by Euroitalia. 

They won an “Oscar des Parfums” for best male perfume in 1996 from the French Parfum Academy, the first time ever that the title has been awarded to an Italian brand. Towards the end of the 1990s their sales were around $500 million and in 2003 alone, their revenue reached $633.2 million. 

In 1990, they launched their first men's collection. That year, they also moved the design house into its first official offices and began to design gowns and other more expensive pieces in addition to their original clothing. Their 1990 Spring/Summer women's collection referenced the mythological painting of Raphael, and the duo began to build a reputation for crystal-encrusted clothing. The 1991 Fall/Winter women's collection was also adorned by trinkets, including filigree medals and embellished corsets. The 1992 Fall/Winter women's collection was then inspired by the silver screen of the 1950s, though the collection still included crystal embellished body suits. 

In 1991, their men's collection was awarded the Woolmark Award for the most innovative men's collection of the year. What is considered to be their first foray into international recognition came when Madonna wore a corset made of gemstones and an accompanying jacket from Dolce & Gabbana at the 1991 New York City premiere of Truth or Dare: In Bed with Madonna. The duo then partnered with Madonna in 1993 to design over 1500 costumes for the artist's Girlie Show international tour in support of her 1992 album Erotica. In an interview about the costumes, Madonna stated that, "Their clothes are sexy with a sense of humor—like me." In 1994, the house's trademark double-breasted jacket was named "La Turlington" after model Christy Turlington. That same year the company launched its second main line—D&G, a line aimed at younger individuals. In 1996 the D&G runway show was streamed only on the Internet and not the runway, in an experimental move towards new media. That year Dolce & Gabbana also designed the costumes for the film Romeo + Juliet. 

In the film industry, both Dolce & Gabbana appeared in the 1995 film The Star Maker (L'Uomo delle Stelle) by director Giuseppe Tornatore, playing minor roles as extras. They appeared in more significant cameo roles in Rob Marshall's film-adaptation of Nine. As stylists, they also worked on the music video Girl Panic! by Duran Duran. 

In terms of market expansion, in 1989 Dolce & Gabbana signed an agreement with the Kashiyama group to open their first boutique in Japan. They released their first fragrance for women in 1992, called "Dolce & Gabbana Pour Femme", which was awarded the Perfume Academy's 1993 award for best feminine fragrance of the year. Their first male fragrance, "Dolce & Gabbana pour Homme", was the recipient of the best masculine fragrance of the year award from the same Academy in 1995. That year Dolce & Gabbana's collections caused a controversy with the British and Italian press, when they selected the American gangster motif as inspiration for their work. Dolce & Gabbana transposed this Fall/Winter 1995 inspiration onto women's wear, which critics stated brought an erotic edge to the clothing. The duo had used the motif before in 1992 when photographer Steven Meisel shot an ad campaign for the house in which the models posed in "gangster chic". This included wide-lapelled 1930s style coats and black leather caps. 

Author Nirupama Pundir stated that, "Dolce & Gabbana, with their superfeminine and fantastical style, broke away from the serious and sober-minded fashions that dominated during much of the Nineties."

2000s 
Dolce & Gabbana continued to work with Madonna, designing the costumes for her Drowned World Tour in 2001, in support of her 2000 album Music. They also designed costumes for the international tours of Missy Elliott, Beyoncé, and Mary J. Blige. In 1999, the duo appeared on The Oprah Winfrey Show in support of singer Whitney Houston, who used the show to debut the Dolce & Gabbana designed costumes for her My Love Is Your Love tour, considered by fashion and music critics to be unusually risqué. The duo continued to design costumes for musical artists through the 2000s, including the costumes for Kylie Minogue's Showgirl Homecoming tour. Madonna also participated in Dolce & Gabbana's 2010 advertising campaigns.

In the 2000s, Dolce & Gabbana took a great deal of inspiration from the sport of football as well. In 2003 the men's line took its main inspiration from the world's great football stars. Other forms of art began taking inspirations from Dolce & Gabbana too. In 2003 dance music artist Frankie Knuckles said that the fashion house was a "great barometer" for trends in both fashion and music. As for their impact on the design world, in 2002 the corsets that were a key part of Dolce & Gabbana's early designs were revived by many of Europe's main designers as a trend. In recent years Dolce & Gabbana has begun holding private viewings of their new collections for buyers, in order to sell their collections before they become public and to pre-empt the copying of their designs by fast fashion companies.

By 2005 their turnover was €597 million. In 2006, the company started a new journey in accessories and leather goods for men and women. The company also ventured into cosmetics, with Scarlett Johansson as the face of the advertising campaign. 

In 2006, the brand launched an ad campaign showing two men wearing D&G kissing, which received controversial criticism  by conservatives. As the Guardian cited The ASA (Advertising Standards Authority) of Italy: "We did not consider that a kiss between two men automatically made an ad unacceptable for broadcast… “

2010s

In 2012, D&G was merged with Dolce & Gabbana in order to strengthen the main line. The final independent D&G collection was the Spring/Summer 2012 collection shown in September 2011. The New Yorker published in 2005 that, "Dolce and Gabbana are becoming to the two-thousands what Prada was to the nineteen-nineties and Armani was to the nineteen-eighties—gli stilisti whose sensibility defines the decade." As for personal awards, in both 1996 and 1997 Dolce & Gabbana were named by FHM as the designers of the year. In 2003 GQ Magazine named Dolce & Gabbana among their "Men of the Year". The following year readers of British Elle voted Dolce & Gabbana the best international designers at the 2004 Elle Style Awards. Dolce & Gabbana celebrated the 20th anniversary of their brand on 19 June 2010 at the Piazza della la Scala and Palazzo Marino in Milan. A public exhibition was also held the following day that included a room in which several dozen televisions were piled haphazardly upon each other, each showing a different collection from the design house's twenty-year history.

In 2019, Dolce & Gabbana extended its size range up to UK 22. While all luxury fashion houses cater to women of sizes up to UK 16, the Italian label was one of the first to move in the direction of body positivity and more inclusivity for women.

2020s
In September 2021, Dolce & Gabbana issued its first NFT collection "Collezione Genesi NFT", a nine-piece assembly of NFT tokens, created in collaboration with the digital marketplace UNXD. The collection was sold for 1,885.719 Ether, an equivalent of nearly $5.7 million at the time of the purchase. Five of the pieces were physical creations while the other four pieces were purely digital, having been constructed by UNXD using the Polygon blockchain. The collection included various virtual art items such as "Glass Suit", "Impossible Tiara" and others. As the New York Times and Vogue reported, "it was possibly the first NFT collection created by a major fashion house".

The company worked with the British- American designer Harris Reed to present Somali model Iman Abdulmajid at the 2021 Met Gala fashion event held annually for the benefit of the Metropolitan Museum of Art's Costume Institute in New York City. Harper's Bazaar cites Reed: "fashion has a responsibility "to spark conversation in relation to the injustices that are happening within society today." Iman, who famously faced down institutional racism as a model and founded a line of cosmetics for women of color in 1994, seemed the perfect fit to join the two brands in a collaborative, red carpet statement."

In 2022, Dolce & Gabbana joined forces with the South Korean designer Sohee Park (also known as Miss Sohee) to present her first Fashion Week runway show during the Fall/Winter 2022 season in Milan.

Dolce & Gabbana has a long history of co-branding with various Italian brands. Among notable examples are collaborations with Baci Perugina, an Italian chocolatier, Fiasconaro confectionery, Murano glass company Barovier & Toso, Mian, I Dogi, Venini, Barbini, Salviati, and Tessiture Bevilacqua among many others.

Brands 

Dolce & Gabbana had two central lines (D&G and Dolce&Gabbana) until 2012, when the lines merged under the label Dolce & Gabbana.

Dolce&Gabbana 
Dolce&Gabbana (spelled without spaces, unlike the name of the company) specialises in luxury items inspired by high-designs and is more formal and 'timeless', responding to long-term trends as well as seasonal changes. 
In February 2010, it was announced that American singer Madonna would design a collection of sunglasses titled MDG, set to be released in May of that year.
It also offers fragrances for men and women. An example is 'The One' which is a perfume by Dolce&Gabbana.

D&G 
D&G was the younger, more flamboyant diffusion line of the brand. Unlike Dolce&Gabbana, D&G sold watches as well as clothing: watches were manufactured by Naloni and Binda Group. In 2011, Dolce & Gabbana decided to discontinue the D&G line in order to put "more strength and energy" into their other collections.

Other lines 
Dolce & Gabbana created a bridal collection, but only between 1992 and 1998. The Dolce & Gabbana Home Collection—started in 1994—was also discontinued in 1999, with the exception of unique pieces being created for D&G premises. The first women's beachwear collection was developed in 1989, followed by the first men's beachwear collection in 1992. D&G launched an eyewear line in 1998 and a timepieces line in 2000. That same year D&G launched both a men's and women's underwear collection, separate from their Dolce & Gabbana lingerie collection. In 2001 they launched the D&G Junior line for children. In 2006 the duo launched the Anamalier line of leopard print accessories for women, and in 2007 they launched a line of crocodile travel cases for men. Other bags produced by the house include the Miss Sicily tote bag, and the "Dolce" bag, offered in straw and leather.

In 2009, they launched their first line of color cosmetics, with Scarlett Johansson as the face of the advertising campaign. Dolce & Gabbana launched its first line of fine jewellery in late 2011 with an 80-piece line including bejewelled rosaries, charm bracelets, and necklaces. They later launched a fine jewellery collection for men. Dolce & Gabbana have received several awards for their fragrances, as was described in the above sections. Their current fragrances include: "The One", "Sport", "Light Blue", "Dolce", "Classic", "Sicily", "The One Rose", and the original scents "Pour Homme" and "Parfum". On 16 October 2014, the company announced that Colin Farrell would be the face of their new fragrance called "Intenso."

Internet 
Dolce & Gabbana made the "DG" logo an instantly recognizable symbol, but they were never able to get the matching internet address DG.com. DG.com is one of the oldest Internet domains and was registered in 1986 by the computer company Data General, now defunct. After that company closed in 1999, the url went to EMC before Dollar General purchased it in 2010 after a bidding war with Dolce & Gabbana.

Dolce & Gabbana Casa 
Previewed in August 2021 in Venice on the occasion of the Alta Moda events, the first Dolce&Gabbana Casa Collection showcased four themes for the interior brand - Leo, Zebra, Blu Mediterraneo and Carretto and included various furnitures and interior accessories such as table ornamentals, chandeliers, cabinetry, textiles, and other home decor items. The Casa brand was represented by artisanship items made in collaboration with the Italian masters, and especially, the Venitian experts of furniture handcraft - Murano glass company Barovier & Toso, Mian, I Dogi, Venini, Barbini, Salviati, Tessiture Bevilacqua - who have made their procedural knowledge available to the company. As of March 2022, the Casa brand collection was mostly distributed online.
As Prestige Magazine noted:
"To complement the various backdrops, the designers partnered with famous Murano glass company Barovier & Toso to create spectacular installations like the five chandeliers inspired by D&G’s leopard pattern. Each chandelier measured over 5m in height and featured 56 lights, with leopard decorations and black rostrato (spiked) effects. About 20,000 pieces of hand-blown glass were required to build these works of art..."

Alta Moda

Alta Moda was launched in 2012, inspired by Giovanni Battista Giorgini’s efforts to promote Italian fashion and Made in Italy brands abroad. Over the years, the concept behind the project's idea of couture was to pay a tribute to the Italian domestic artisanship in all its expressions and to its tailoring tradition. Since its first runway show, Dolce&Gabbana has presented new collections discovering renowned Italian landmarks such as Teatro alla Scala in Milan, Piazza San Marco in Venice or Temple of Concordia, Agrigento. 
 
The main lines of the Alta Moda:
Alta Moda – Women's line 
Alta Sartoria – Men’s line 
Alta Gioielleria – Men’s and Women’s line 
Alta Orologeria – Men’s and Women’s line

Timeline
July 2012 – Taormina. The first Dolce & Gabbana Alta Moda presentation takes place in Taormina, Sicily, and is consisted of 73 designs that highlighted the Italian artisanship. The show began with a launch of Bellini's Bel Canto opera Norma in the ancient Roman amphitheater, followed by the event next day in the former monastery of San Domenico. The first autumn/winter collection was made in keeping with the traditions of Sicilian historical periods, including modern adaptation of Luchino Visconti’s The Leopard (1963 film) radiating the changes in Sicilian life and society during the Risorgimento.

2013 – Milan/Venice. Dolce&Gabbana presents its first Alta Moda in Milan. The Collection was influenced by the symbols of the city. Dolce&Gabbana presented its third Alta Moda Collection in the frescoed halls of the historic Palazzo Barbaro in Venice overlooking the Grand Canal. The collection event was in part influenced by Byzantine and Venetian cathedral mosaics. The fashion show was followed by a masked ball inside another historic Venetian palace - Palazzo Pisani Moretta.

2014 – Milan/Capri. Impressionist and Modern Art Collections were demonstrated in La Scala, Milan’s 18th-century opera house with the flower style designs. Dolce&Gabbana presented the Alta Moda Collection on the island of Capri.

2015 – Milan/Portofin. Dolce&Gabbana presented the Alta Moda Collection in the Toscanini foyer of Teatro alla Scala . Alta Sartoria and Alta Gioielleria Collection amplified couture line for men and women upheld in the Palazzo Labus, a 17th-century building in Corso Venezia, followed by the new Alta Moda, Alta Sartoria and Alta Gioielleria Collections during a 4-day event in Portofino in July. The Portofino collection was influenced by William Shakespeare's A Midsummer Night's Dream and became one of the designers’ biggest productions with 94 models and 80 performers taking part in the show.

2016 – Milan/Naples. Alta Moda in Milan was dedicated to Elvira Leonardi Bouyeure, a notable Italian fashion designer and couturier of the post-war period who lived in the same city. The events started with the presentation of the Alta Gioielleria inside the Alta Moda Salons of Via Senato. The following day, the historic Palazzo Labus hosted the Alta Sartoria fashion show. The collection included lines for men and women as well as "molto Italiano" - Alta Moda jewellery craftsmanship that reflected historic art influence, such as painted vistas of Venice. Milan’s La Scala was the stage of the Alta Moda show: the clothes were influenced by the heroines of the operas of the composer Giacomo Puccini. Villa Pignatelli was the location for the presentation of the new Alta Gioielleria creations and Castel dell'Ovo was the setting for the Alta Sartoria fashion show.

2017 – Milan/Palermo. Alta Moda Milan fashion show took place inside the laboratories of Teatro alla Scala in Milan, former Ansaldo steelworks. The Alta Gioielleria creations were presented inside the Alta Moda Salons in Via Senato while, the stage of Teatro alla Scala hosted the Alta Sartoria fashion show; the collection was entirely dedicated to the Italian composer Giuseppe Verdi and his masterpieces. During the Men’s show, were presented the first four examples of Alta Orologeria.

April 2017 – Tokyo, Japan and Beijing, China. On April 13th, Dolce & Gabbana presented its Collection at the National Museum of Tokyo, a tribute to the Japanese culture and Italian tradition: Asian engravings and references to Renaissance painting, oriental and Baroque styles. One week later, the Peninsula Hotel in Beijing hosted the Alta Moda and Alta Sartoria fashion show dedicated to the Chinese arts culture.

July 2017 – Palermo. Alta Moda Palermo was held in Pretoria Square in the historical center of Palermo. Palazzo Gangi hosted the presentation of the new Women's Alta Gioielleria creations; for the first time, a Collection of Men's Alta Gioielleria pieces were showcased at Palazzo Mazzarino. The Alta Moda looks illuminated Piazza Pretoria, while the setting for the Alta Sartoria fashion show was the Cathedral of Monreale.  

 April 2018 – New York, USA + Mexico City, Mexico. Dolce&Gabbana brought the Grand Tour to New York, where the 4-day events opened with the presentation of the Alta Gioielleria Collection at the New York Public Library. The Alta Sartoria fashion show took place at the Rainbow Room of Rockefeller Center and the Alta Moda show was staged at the Metropolitan Opera House. A few days after the events in New York, Dolce&Gabbana presented an Alta Moda and Alta Sartoria fashion show in Mexico City at the Soumaya Museum; the main source of influence was painter Frida Kahlo's art.

2018 – Como/Milan. In 2018, the show was held on the shores of the lake Como. The presentation of the new Alta Gioielleria creations was held on the Steamship Concordia sailing towards Bellagio. The Alta Moda show took place at the Teresio Olivelli Park in Tremezzina. The collection was a tribute to the first historical novel of Italian literature, The Betrothed. Villa Carlotta was the location for the Alta Sartoria show. Among the top models who presented Alta Moda collection were Naomi Campbell, Eva Herzigova and Helena Christensen.

2019 – Agrigento/Milan. Alta Moda 2019 was first held in Agrigento, a city on the southern coast of Sicily with more than 400 guests visiting the show. The main event was the womenswear show Alta Moda. Another collection - the Alta Gioielleria - took place in a nearby town of Palma di Montechiaro, the birthplace of Giuseppe Tomasi di Lampedusa. The event that took place in December 2019 in Milan featured a new menswear collection, which was held in the Biblioteca Ambrosiana in Milan, a landmark historical library founded in 1609 by Milan’s Archbishop, Cardinal Borromeo.

2020 – Florence. Due to Covid-19, Dolce & Gabbana held two online summer shows of Alta Moda in July 2020. There was also a single live three day event that happened in September 2020, while Alta Moda and Alta Sartoria were also presented online. The menswear collection Dolce & Gabbana Alta Sartoria was housed in the 12th-century Palazzo Vecchio and included such items as brocade velvet blazers, silk blouses and jewel-caked slippers.

2021 – Venice. In 2021, the show celebrated the 1600th anniversary of Venice founding in 421 AD. The event was run in several historical places of Venice: the Doge’s Palace, the Venetian Arsenal, and the Rialto Bridge while the models were brought to the runways by gondolas.

Partnerships

Sports 
Dolce & Gabbana has designed the on-field attire for A.C. Milan since 2004. In addition to having their on-field uniforms designed by Dolce & Gabbana, A.C. Milan players also dress in team-issued Dolce & Gabbana attire when at official functions off the field. The duo also designed the off-field suits for the Italy national football team. In 2010, Dolce & Gabbana signed a three-year deal with the Chelsea F.C. to design and provide the club's on- and off-field uniforms and attire. The deal included the creation of clothing for female staff members in addition to male staff members and the players themselves. The off-field outfits designed for the club included a dark blue suit featuring the lion symbol on the breast pocket. The designers also re-designed the club's director's lounge and main office reception area. Dolce & Gabbana were also the named sponsors of the Milano Thunder Italian Boxing Team.

Products 
In 2006, Dolce & Gabbana partnered with Motorola to produce the Motorola V3i Dolce & Gabbana cellular phone. In 2009, Dolce & Gabbana partnered with Sony Ericsson to produce a version of its Jalou cellular phone line with 24-karat gold details and the logo of the design house emblazoned on the co-designed piece of technology. Dolce & Gabbana also partnered with Citroën to co-design a version of their C3 Pluriel vehicle. In 2010 Dolce & Gabbana partnered with Martini to produce a "gold edition" of its vermouth. In 2010 the design house then teamed with singer Madonna to release a co-designed line of sunglasses called MDG.

Advertising campaigns 
The commercial for the first women fragrance of Dolce & Gabbana ran for several years in Italy, created by filmmaker Giuseppe Tornatore, scored by Ennio Morricone, and starred actress Monica Bellucci. The 30-second commercial begins with a man slapping an octopus against the stone ridges of a tide pool. He stands and looks around his surroundings at different women going about their daily lives. One woman (Bellucci) is seen changing into a 1950s-style bathing suit behind a white sheet being held up by two other women. After she changes, she tosses her bra atop a prickly pear cactus and walks towards the ocean. Later she is seen lying atop a well-made bed, and the man who saw her is standing outside her window, holding her bra up to his nose. The film closes with the image of the Dolce & Gabbana fragrance bottles against a black backdrop. In 2003, the Dolce & Gabbana perfume Sicily was advertised in another commercial about a Sicilian funeral, which was also directed by Giuseppe Tornatore.

Gisele Bündchen starred in the 2006 commercial for the fragrance "The One", featuring Bundchen in front of a vanity mirror being made up, with flashes of a mob of cameramen interspersed; she then puts on a golden dress, shoes, and a pair of D&G sunglasses. Photographers and filmmakers that have worked with Dolce & Gabbana on advertising campaigns have included Giampaolo Barbieri, Michel Comte, Fabrizio Ferri, Steven Klein, Steven Meisel, Mert + Marcus, Jean Baptiste Mondino, Ferdinando Scianna, Giampaolo Sgura, Mario Sorrenti, Sølve Sundsbø, Mario Testino, Giuseppe Tornatore, and Mariano Vivanco. Dolce & Gabbana have won two Leadawards for their campaigns from Germany's leading advertising awards. In 2004 they won for their Fall/Winter 2003/04 campaign and in 2006 they won for their Fall/Winter 2005/06 campaign.

Inspirations and style 

Originally inspired by eclectic, thrift shop bohemian style, Dolce & Gabbana's deeply colored, animal prints have been described as "haute hippy dom" taking inspiration in particular from Italy's prestigious film history. "When we design it's like a movie (Domenico)," says Domenico Dolce. "We think of a story and we design the clothes to go with it (Domenico)." They claim to be more concerned about creating the best, most flattering clothes than sparking trends, once admitting that they wouldn't mind if their only contribution to fashion history was a black bra (Dolce & Gabbana 2007). Sicily and Sicilian culture is the most important style and identity of Dolce & Gabbana.

D & G trademarks include underwear-as-outerwear (such as corsets and bra fastenings), gangster boss pinstripe suits, and extravagantly printed coats. Meanwhile, their feminine collections are always backed by powerful ad campaigns, like the black-and-white ads featuring model Marpessa photographed by Ferdinando Scianna in 1987 (Dolce & Gabbana). "They find their way out of any black dress, any buttoned-up blouse (Domenico)," says Rossellini. "The first piece of theirs I wore was a white shirt, very chaste, but cut to make my breasts look as if they were bursting out of it (Domenico)."

Once dubbed the "Gilbert and George of Italian fashion", Dolce & Gabbana gave their fashion interests a musical turn in 1996, by recording their own single, in which they intoned the words "D&G is love" over a techno beat (Dolce & Gabbana 2011). Newer to the design game than other heavyweight Italian fashion houses such as Armani and Versace, the pair acknowledge that luck has played its part in their phenomenal success. By 1997, their company reported a turnover of €400 million, prompting both designers to announce that they planned to retire by the age of 40 – a promise they did not keep (Domenico).

After the designers spotted a Veneziano painting of Christ on the cross wearing a pair of their branded underwear briefs in the Venice Biennale, they commissioned the artist to do a portrait of them with the Madonna portrayed as the likeness of the chanteuse and performer Madonna Ciccone and the courtiers as two putti at her feet.

In January 2016, the company launched a high-end fashion range aimed at wealthy Muslim women featuring a collection of hijabs and abayas printed with daisies, lemons and roses.

Books 
In addition to designing clothing, Dolce & Gabbana have co-authored nearly two dozen books featuring photographic narratives as well as collections of their own work. The proceeds of many of these books go to charities including the Children's Action Network and the Butterfly Onlus "école sans frontières" Foundation. The following is a bibliography of their literary works:

 1996 - 10 Anni Dolce & Gabbana (A collection of the most important advertising and editorial images of the design house's first decade) 
 1997 - Wildness 
 1998 - Animal 
 2003 - Hollywood (Features over 100 photographs of the movie stars from the post-1985 era) 
 Calcio (Photographs of 44 soccer players, 3 teams, and 2 coaches)
 A.C. Milan
 2004 - Music (Features over 150 of globally recognised musicians) 
 20 Years Dolce & Gabbana (A chronological photographic history of each of the house's collections, using over 1000 photos)
 2006 - Milan 
 2006 Italia (A book celebrating the 2006 World Cup title won by Italy)
 2006 - Fashion Album (Contains over 400 images paying homage to the great fashion photographers of Dolce & Gabbana collections) 
 2007 - Secret Ceremony 
 Family (A book that focuses on the family as the center of a man's life)
 The Good Shepherd (A book that illustrates the day of a common shephard, wearing Dolce & Gabbana clothing)
 Milano Beach Soccer
 2008 - Diamonds & Pearls 
 2010 - 20 Years of Dolce & Gabbana for Men 
 2011 - Icons 1990–2010 
 2011 - Fashion Shows 1990 – 2010 
 Nazionale Italiana: South Africa 2010 (A series of images starring the Italy National Football Team during the training sessions preceding the 2010 FIFA World Cup)
 2011 - Uomini 
 Milan Fashion Soccer Players Portraits
 2011 - David Gandy (A 280-page photographic coffee table book of images chronicling collaborations with British model David Gandy from 2006 to 2011) 
 2012 - Campioni 
 2013 - Lionel Andres Messi 
 2016 - Lin Dan 
 2017 - Generations: Millennials: The New Renaissance

Spaces and exhibitions 
Dolce & Gabbana opened the La sede di via San Damiano atelier in September 1995. They opened a combined seven-floor boutique and corporate space Lo showroom di via Goldoni in 2002, moving from its prior main showroom at Piazza Umanitaria. In July 2006 Dolce & Gabbana then opened a 5,000 square foot show floor Lo showroom di via Broggi in Milan. The design house also bought the Il Metropol theatre in Milan, a historic cinema built in the 1940s. It was renovated and reopened in September 2005. In 2006 Dolce & Gabbana opened IL GOLD, an establishment with café, bar, bistro, and restaurant areas. This is followed by the opening of a co-sponsored drinking establishment the duo founded at their Milanese men's showroom called the Martini Bar in 2003. An additional Martini Bar was later opened at their Shanghai showroom in 2006. In 2009 Dolce & Gabbana had 93 boutiques and 11 factory outlets, and was sold in over 80 countries. In all they have 251 mono-brand stores.

In the United States standalone boutiques can be found in Bal Harbour, Beverly Hills, Chicago, Houston, Las Vegas, and New York City. Dolce & Gabbana also operates boutiques in other cities in select department stores: Nordstrom, Saks Fifth Avenue, Neiman Marcus, and Bergdorf Goodman.

In addition to developing runway shows and advertising campaigns for its collections, Dolce & Gabbana use their spaces to host photography and other art exhibitions. Soon after the opening of the Il Metropol, they hosted two exhibitions by artist Ron Arad in the lobby space: Blo-Glo between April 2006 and April 2007, and Bodyguards in late April 2007. They held photography exhibitions featuring the work of Enzo Sellerio in 2007 and Herbert List in 2008. In 2011 Dolce & Gabbana held an open house and architectural exhibition with Studio Piuarch showcasing the studio's various architectural designs and projects since 1996. Studio Piuarch built the Dolce & Gabbana headquarters in 2006, which was where the exhibition and open house was held.

Dolce & Gabbana also uses its spaces for book launches and photographic exhibitions of its own clothing, such as the book launch of their book David Gandy in 2011. They also use other spaces as well, such as the Palazzo della Ragione in Milan, where in May 2009 they staged a photographic exhibition of over 100 images selected from the history of US Vogue over its 90-year history. The exhibition was called Extreme Beauty in Vogue.

The company has production factories in Legnano and Incisa in Val d'Arno.

Controversies

Advertising 

Following complaints from consumer groups in February 2007, Dolce & Gabbana pulled an advertisement in Spain that showed a man holding a woman to the ground by her wrists while a group of men look on. Spain's Labour and Social Affairs Ministry branded the campaign as illegal and humiliating to women, saying the woman's body position had no relation to the products Dolce & Gabbana was trying to sell. Italian publications followed suit, banning the ad. According to Debonair Magazine, «this Dolce & Gabbana advertisement has been criticized as a glorification of gang-rape. While one can never be sure of D&G’s true intent, the company’s penchant is for controversy.» When asked about the ad being banned in Spain, Dolce & Gabbana responded that the "Spaniards were a bit backward."
 
According to The Huffington Post UK, feminist writer Louise Pennington recently also commented on the image. She stated that, "This particular image is a representative of an increasingly misogynistic contraction of women in the fashion industry demonstrating very clear links between the fashion-beauty industry and the mainstreaming of pornography. Those who suggest this image is harmless fail to recognize the reality of rape culture and the dehumanization of women's bodies in our pornographic mainstream media."

Hong Kong photography ban 

 
On January 5, 2012, it was reported that Hong Kong residents had been prevented from taking pictures of Dolce & Gabbana window displays in both their Hong Kong stores. In particular staff and security personnel at their flagship store on Canton Road asserted the pavement area outside was private property where photography was forbidden. The actions sparked protests spanning several days and gained international news coverage on 8 January. Citing the case of Zhou Jiugeng, a Nanjing official whose high-living lifestyle was identified by mainland Chinese internet users using photographs, local news reports speculated that the Dolce & Gabbana photo ban may have been imposed at the request of some wealthy Chinese government officials attempting to block details on the source of their wealth. 
 
Dolce & Gabbana issued a formal apology to the people of Hong Kong from its Milan headquarters on 18 January 2012, confirming that it had no relation to the incident.

Gay adoption and in vitro fertilization 
In an interview on 16 March 2015 issue of Italian magazine Panorama, Stefano Gabbana and Domenico Dolce caused controversy when they remarked, "We oppose gay adoptions. The only family is the traditional one." They also criticized in vitro fertilisation (IVF) and surrogacy by saying, "No chemical offspring and rented uterus: life has a natural flow, there are things that should not be changed." 
 
Critics took to social media to voice their opposition, with the hashtag #BoycottDolceGabbana garnering 30,000 tweets on Twitter in five days. Celebrities, including Elton John, Madonna, Victoria Beckham, Ricky Martin, Martina Navratilova and Courtney Love, were among those expressing anger over the remarks. 
 
According to Guardian, “in an interview in 2006, Gabbana revealed that he had approached a woman to be the mother of his baby but made it clear that he struggled with the idea of a same-sex family.
“I am opposed to the idea of a child growing up with two gay parents,” he said. “A child needs a mother and a father. I could not imagine my childhood without my mother. I also believe that it is cruel to take a baby away from its mother.”
 
More than 10,000 people signed an online petition calling for Macy's and Debenhams to stop stocking the brand in their department stores, until D&G retracted their statements and apologized. Protesters also gathered outside Dolce & Gabbana's flagship London shop calling for an international boycott of the luxury fashion store.
 
Dolce & Gabbana criticized calls for a boycott on their brand as "medieval" and called to boycott Elton John. During an interview with CNN, the pair said "they respected how people chose to live their lives, including the use of IVF, and said others should also respect differences in opinion. They also added that they could have expressed themselves using better language to the Italian magazine but appeared taken aback by the social media backlash. "

Shanghai event promotion video 
In November 2018, Dolce & Gabbana released a series of videos on Instagram, Facebook and Twitter profiles, as well as its Sina Weibo account in China, featuring a Chinese model with her eye intentionally narrowed, dressed up in the brand's garments and accessories and clumsily attempting to use chopsticks to eat Italian food in a pretentious way. The video narratage is in Standard Mandarin with a hubristic and lecturing tone, while having sexually suggestive lines.
 
Social media users commented that it reflects Dolce & Gabbana's lack of understanding of Chinese culture and racism. Under the public pressure, D&G removed this series from its Sina Weibo whilst still keeping them on Instagram. Social media outcry was further exacerbated by a screen capture of racist comments alleged to have been made from the D&G co-founder Stefano Gabbana's Instagram account, Later Dolce & Gabbana claimed on Instagram that both the brand's and the designer's accounts had been hacked, also issuing a video where they apologized for the ads and asked for forgiveness from the Chinese people. “We have always been in love with China,” Dolce said in the video. “We love your culture and we certainly have much to learn. That is why we are sorry if we made mistakes in the way we expressed ourselves.” “We will never forget this experience and it will certainly never happen again,” Gabbana said. “From the bottom of our hearts, we ask for forgiveness.”  Stefano Gabbana complained about removing the videos from the internet and called China the "Ignorant Dirty Smelling Mafia", adding that it was a "country of shit" and "feel inferiors" in the message. Later Dolce & Gabbana claimed on Instagram that both the brand's and the designer's accounts had been hacked.
 
Wang Junkai and Dilraba Dilmurat, both of whom served as the brand's celebrity ambassadors, severed their ties with the company. Other celebrities, including Zhang Ziyi, Li Bingbing and Chen Kun withdrew from the event. Ultimately, the show was cancelled by the brand.
 
Chinese e-commerce sites, including Alibaba and JD.com, removed the products of Dolce & Gabbana. The founders of Dolce & Gabbana apologized in a video on 23 November, which was posted on its Sina Weibo account, and also posted on Instagram and Facebook later. Throughout the video, the founders can be seen reading off a script from a teleprompter located on the right. At the end of the video, the founders were saying "对不起" (sorry) in Chinese. Meanwhile, the three videos were finally removed from the official Instagram account.

Legal issues 
In May 2009, the Italian government charged Dolce & Gabbana with tax evasion for having moved assets of about 249 million euros to Luxembourg in the 2004–2006 period. On 19 June 2013, they were found guilty of failing to declare 1 billion euros ($1.3 billion) of income to authorities after moving their brand to Gado, a Luxembourg-based holding company. The court sentenced them both to one year and eight months in jail. Dolce & Gabbana filed an appeal. On 30 April 2014, a three judge panel overruled the appeal and decided to uphold the initial sentence. Finally, on 24 October 2014, both Domenico Dolce and Stefano Gabbana were found not guilty of tax evasion by the Italian Court of Justice. 
 
Following the cancellation of their 2018 show in China, Dolce and Gabbana filed a lawsuit against fashion watchdog Diet Prada, claiming defamation by the bloggers who reposted anti-Asian comments made by one of their designers. The $USD600m claim argued that the Instagram account was responsible for encouraging public backlash, the cancellation of their show and loss of business. In the lawsuit, the petitioners once again claimed that their Instagram account was hacked and then publicly apologized for the incident.  The loss of business in question includes Chinese retailer Yangmatou taking down 58,000 Dolce and Gabbana products from their store.  Luxury western retailers, such as Net-a-Porter, also removed them from their brand list. Fashion Law Institute lawyers are defending the Diet Prada founders.

References

Further reading 

 "Dolce & Gabbana." The Thames & Hudson Dictionary of Fashion and Fashion Designers. London: Thames & Hudson, 2007. Credo Reference. Web. 29 November 2011.
 "Gabbana, Stefano." Marquis Who's Who in the World. New Providence: Marquis Who's Who LLC, 2011. Credo Reference. Web. 29 November 2011.
 "Gabbana, Stefano." The Thames & Hudson Dictionary of Fashion and Fashion Designers. London: Thames & Hudson, 2007. Credo Reference. Web. 29 November 2011.
 "Domenico Dolce Quotes – Swide Magazine ." Swide Magazine by Dolce&Gabbana. Swide Magazine, 2 June 2011. Web. 29 November 2011.
 "Dolce & Gabbana – Biography on Bio." Bio: Shows, Video, TV Schedule and More on Bio. AETN UK. Web. 29 November 2011.

External links 

 
 
 Dolce & Gabbana on FASHION NET 

 
Clothing brands of Italy
Shoe companies of Italy
High fashion brands
Luxury brands
Fashion accessory companies
Companies based in Milan
Retail companies established in 1985
Clothing companies established in 1985
Italian companies established in 1985
Privately held companies of Italy
Bags (fashion)
Underwear brands
Watch manufacturing companies of Italy
Eyewear brands of Italy